In physics, relativistic chaos is the application of chaos theory to dynamical systems described primarily by general relativity, and also special relativity.

One of the earlier references on the topic is (Barrow 1982) and a particularly relevant result is that relativistic chaos is coordinate invariant (Motter 2003).

See also

Quantum chaos

References

Chaos theory
General relativity
Mathematical physics
Theoretical physics